Ignacio Russo Cordero (born 13 December 2000) is an Argentine professional footballer who plays as a forward for Chacarita Juniors, on loan from Rosario Central.

Career
Russo started out in Rosario with Gimnasia y Esgrima, before later heading to ADIUR. 2016 saw the forward join Rosario Central. Before his breakthrough into the first-team, he scored three goals in twenty-eight matches for the academy and five goals in nineteen games for the reserves. Russo moved into the senior set-up in late-2020, initially appearing on the substitute's bench for fixtures with River Plate and Banfield in the Copa de la Liga Profesional. It was in that competition that he made his debut, as he featured for the final sixteen minutes of a draw away to Banfield on 4 December; having replaced Alan Bonansea.

On 11 January 2022, Russo joined Primera Nacional club Chacarita Juniors on a one-year loan deal.

Personal life
Russo is the son of manager and former footballer Miguel Ángel Russo.

Career statistics
.

Notes

References

External links

2000 births
Living people
Footballers from Rosario, Santa Fe
Argentine footballers
Association football forwards
Argentine Primera División players
Primera Nacional players
Rosario Central footballers
Chacarita Juniors footballers